Martin Smyth (12 November 1936 – 25 November 2012) was an Irish boxer. He competed in the men's featherweight event at the 1956 Summer Olympics.

References

1936 births
2012 deaths
Irish male boxers
Olympic boxers of Ireland
Boxers at the 1956 Summer Olympics
Boxers from Belfast
Male boxers from Northern Ireland
Featherweight boxers